Baldassare Cenci, seniore (1648–1709) was a Roman Catholic cardinal.

Biography
Baldassare Cenci was born in 1648 in Rome, the youngest and fifth child of Virginio Cenci and Maria Vittoria Verospi. His nephew is cardinal Baldassare Cenci (iuniore).

On 30 September 1691 he was consecrated bishop by Fabrizio Spada, Cardinal-Priest of San Crisogono, with Ercole Visconti, Titular Archbishop of Tamiathis, and Michelangelo Mattei, Titular Archbishop of Hadrianopolis in Haemimonto, serving as co-consecrators.

Cenci died on 26 May 1709 in Fermo, Italy.

Episcopal succession

References

1648 births
1709 deaths
18th-century Italian cardinals
17th-century Italian cardinals
Clergy from Rome